Lionel C. Martin is an American music video director, film director and VJ from Queens, New York. While he is known primarily as a music video director, he has also directed the films Def Jam's How to Be a Player and Longshot.

Martin also co-created and co-hosts the music video program Video Music Box with Ralph McDaniels.

Videography

References

External links
 
 
 
 

African-American film directors
American music video directors
Film directors from New York City
Living people
People from Queens, New York
VJs (media personalities)
Year of birth missing (living people)
21st-century African-American people